Robin Ingle is a Canadian entrepreneur and a specialist in special risk insurance, travel security and healthcare who currently serves as the chairman and CEO of MSH Americas. Ingle has been in the insurance industry for over 40 years. He is frequently consulted by the media and the insurance industry as an authority on travel insurance, global security and health care issues. Ingle is also actively involved in the film and media industry, working as an executive producer and writer for media production companies DreamMore Films and sisu production. His experience in this space includes the creation of independent films, documentaries and corporate videos.

Since 1994, Ingle has been recognized in the Canadian Who's Who, a biographical reference publication. He was included in the Canadian Who's Who 2017-2018 Print Edition.

Personal life
Ingle was born in Toronto, Ontario to John Ingle and Muriel Ingle. His ancestral origins include Finnish and Canadian. His father, John, worked as a farmer and mine foreman in the nickel mines of Sudbury, Ontario, while his mother, Muriel, came from a family of Finnish socialists who moved from Finland to Northern Ontario in the 1920s.

Ingle attended the University of Waterloo, although he utilised distance education and never actually studied on campus. He studied computer science and the arts at other educational institutions, although he eventually left his studies to work full-time.  Ingle opened his first business, a pizzeria, when he was 17 years of age.

Career
Ingle grew up in the travel insurance industry. Following the end of World War II, immigrants new to Canada who were not financially established were denied policies by insurance companies. Social healthcare coverage did not exist at the time.  In 1946, Ingle’s parents, John and Muriel Ingle, founded John Ingle Insurance which offered insurance for new immigrants to Canada, an idea inspired by the family’s immigrant background and an obvious consumer need. Muriel Ingle was one of the first licensed insurance women in Ontario.

In 1976, Ingle formally joined the family business. He became the president of Ingle Insurance in 1985 and purchased the business after four years as president.  He ran the business until 1998, when the Ingle family’s interests in Ingle Health were sold to the investment arm of a Canadian financial institution.

In 1975, Ingle founded See World Travel, a travel agency. In 1976, he founded Study Tours, a tour company that provided travel and course credits for students.
In 1987, Ingle founded Worldwide Security and Protection Corp., an international security and protective services firm.

In 2001, Ingle founded Imagine Financial, a Canadian Managing General Insurance Agent (MGA).

In 2002, a settlement was received by Ingle and his family from the institution that purchased Ingle Health, and the company once again resumed operations in Canada as Ingle, now functioning as a managing general insurance underwriter (MGU) and managing general insurance agent (MGA).

In 2006, Ingle, as CEO of the Ingle Group of Companies, founded Health Care Services International Inc. (HCSI), known as Novus Health/Santé, a Canadian health navigation, information, and health assessment provider. In 2008, Ingle created Peak Contact, a technology development company to be included in the Group of Companies. In 2011, Intrepid 24/7 was also launched by Ingle as an emergency travel and medical assistance service. In 2013, sisu production was founded by Ingle and Jaana Hein as a media production company. Ingle is an Executive Producer. In 2017, Ingle merged the insurance and assistance businesses with MSH International, a provider of expatriate insurance and life & disability insurance solutions, and a subsidiary of the French Group SIACI SAINT HONORE. He currently serves as CEO and shareholder of the merged operations. Ingle also owns and manages Health Care Services International Inc., encompassing Novus Health/Santé and Travel Navigator.

Ingle’s companies have won several industry awards. In 2012, Ingle International was named ITIJ’s Insurer/Underwriter of the Year.  In 2013, Intrepid 24/7 was a Finalist for ITIJ's Assistance Company of the Year. In 2014, Intrepid 24/7 received the Insurance Canada Technology Award in the Supplier category for their Travel Navigator app. In 2016, sisu production won third place in TVO’s short documentary contest for the film, I am a Doctor, directed by Jaana Hein. In 2017, Travel Navigator was a Finalist for Specialist Service Provider of the Year. In 2018, Ingle International was a Finalist for Insurer of the Year. Ingle International has also been a frequent finalist for the Insurance Canada Technology Awards in the Distributor category.
Ingle has worked with high-profile journalists such as Robert Young Pelton for security and travel consultations. He is also frequently invited to travel to various international industry conventions and conferences as a guest speaker to share his experiences and insights. He has expanded his companies to Europe and Latin America to open offices in Malta, Chile, Mexico, and Brazil.

Ingle's major contributions to the insurance industry include the introduction of specialized products in travel insurance such high risk and snow bird insurance, as well as designing a specialized distribution model of insurance products in banks and direct marketing to international students and travellers.

Ingle is also actively involved in film and media production. He has partnered with Robert Young Pelton to distribute Young's films and TV episodes, and has acted as executive producer in a number of films including the feature documentaries No Regrets (2019) and Soul Circus (2019), TV series My Next Challenge (2019) and Where 2 Next (2019), and shorts 10 Minutes For A Pound (2019), and I am a Doctor (2019), and Lock Job (2015).

Ingle has served as past director for global companies such as Green Globe, Global Environmental Group (NGO), Confederacion de Organizaciones Turisticas de la America Latina (COTAL); and the Canadian Better Business Bureau. Robin has been a member of the World Economic Forum (WEF), and is a Global Member and an Advisor of the World Travel and Tourism Council (WTTC).

References

Canadian company founders
Year of birth missing (living people)
Living people
Canadian chief executives
Businesspeople from Toronto
Chief executives in the finance industry
Canadian industrialists
University of Waterloo alumni
Canadian chairpersons of corporations
Canadian people of Finnish descent